Taneli Mäkelä (born 10 March 1959) is a Finnish actor, singer and writer. He appeared in more than seventy films since 1985.

Selected filmography

References

External links
 

1959 births
Living people
People from Espoo
Finnish male film actors
Finnish male television actors
20th-century Finnish male actors
21st-century Finnish male actors